= Chris Glenn =

Australian-born DJ, narrator, and Japanese historian

- Born: Christopher John Glenn; February 28, 1968 (age 58); Adelaide, South Australia, Australia
- Occupations: Radio DJ, TV presenter, narrator, MC, columnist, author, copywriter, inbound tourism advisor
- Years active: 1986–present
- Agent(s): Past & Present Future (PPF)
- Height: 188 cm (6 ft 2 in)
- Website: chris-glenn.com

Chris Glenn (born 28 February 1968) is an Australian-born, Japan-based bilingual radio DJ, television presenter, narrator, MC, columnist, author, and Japanese historian specializing in samurai castles, battles, armor, and weapons. A resident of Nagoya since 1993, he has been designated Nagoya Tourism, Culture & Exchange Special Ambassador, Sekigahara Tourism Ambassador, and Ōmi Tourism Ambassador.

== Biography ==
Christopher John Glenn was born in Adelaide, South Australia on 28 February 1968. His parents are John, a former South Australian police officer, and Val (née Nicholson). He grew up in Murray Bridge, Millicent, and Victor Harbor before first coming to Japan in 1985 as a Rotary exchange student, spending one year in Sapporo, Hokkaidō, hosted by the Sapporo Teine Rotary Club and attending Sapporo Seiryo High School, where he joined the kendo club and achieved the rank of shodan (first dan).

== Career ==
=== Radio ===
On returning to Australia in 1986, Glenn studied at the South Australian School of Broadcasting before beginning his career at Murray Bridge station 5MU.

In 1989, he joined Adelaide’s 5DN as a copywriter and on-air personality, one of just four announcers retained when the station transitioned to FM in 1991 as 102.3 FM with a Classic Hits format, later becoming X102 with an adult rock format.

In 1992, Glenn returned permanently to Japan, working at a small advertising agency and the satellite broadcaster Radio Sky 1 (KTYO) in Tokyo. From October 1993, he was one of the original DJs (Navigators) at Nagoya-based ZIP-FM, remaining until 2004. From 2004 to 2010, he worked at RADIO-i before returning to ZIP-FM in 2011, where he continues to host RADIO ORBIT (Sundays, 09:00–13:00).

He also hosted programs on KISS-FM Kobe, including an 80’s specialty show and the KISS Hot 100 Countdown until 2005.

Glenn is known for using the Japanese greeting "Dōmo Dōmo Dōmo!" on air. According to the fan site BubblegumDancer, the Swedish pop duo Smile.dk released a song titled "Domo Domo Domo" that was inspired by this catchphrase. Pokémon Smash! (TV Tokyo) has been reported to have used the track as an opening theme.

In 2018, Paul McCartney opened his Nagoya Dome concert with the greeting "Dōmo Dōmo Dōmo! Konbanwa, Nagoya!", reportedly after Glenn suggested it to him in a pre-show interview.

=== Television ===
Glenn has appeared on numerous Japanese national and regional television programs. He currently hosts NHK World programs Ninja Truth and Samurai Castles.

Other appearances include:

- Bura Tamori (NHK)
- Ame-jipang! (TBS)
- Knowledge (Mainichi Broadcasting System)
- Journeys in Japan (NHK World)
- Shittoko! (MBS)
- Eko no Sahō (BS Asahi)
- P-KAN Rekishi no Aru Fūkei (Tokai TV, narration)
- Pīkan TV Genki ga Iine (Tokai TV)
- Gourmet Navi (Chukyo TV, narration)
- Nagoya Weekly (CBC, reporter)
- Sokoga Shiritai (CBC, reporter)
- Mai Town (CBC, narration & reporting)
- Kibun wa Bibidebabidebu (Nagoya TV)
- Kokekokko (Nagoya TV)
- Sarasara Salad (NHK Nagoya)
- Zoom In!! Saturday (NTV)
- Unchiku-kun (NTV)
- BS Netsuyawa – Sekigahara Night (NHK BS2)
- 3-ji no Tsubo! (TV Aichi)
- Otaka Hasshin Tower DAI-NAMO (CBC)
- Tatakai no Shiro Special: Yamashiro e Ikō! (History Channel, 2016)

=== Aviation and Friendship Flight 2005 ===
In 2005, Glenn co-piloted the Friendship Flight 2005 project with Takashi Nishimori, flying a light helicopter from Melbourne to Nagoya to commemorate the 25th anniversaries of sister-state and sister-city relationships, as well as Expo 2005 Aichi. The 12,000 km flight included 43 stops across six countries and two emergency landings, one requiring rescue services in Irian Jaya. Glenn holds helicopter pilot licenses from the FAA (United States), CASA (Australia), and JCAB (Japan).

Following the 2011 Tōhoku earthquake and tsunami, Glenn was among volunteer helicopter pilots delivering supplies to affected areas.

=== History and culture ===
Glenn apprenticed in 1994 with Nagoya-based samurai armour craftsman Atsuta Shindō and studied martial arts including Owari Yagyū Shinkage-ryū and Enmei-ryū kobudō at Shunpukan Dōjō. In 2023, he became the first non-Japanese member of the board of the Japan Castle Association.

In September 2025, Glenn became the first non-Japanese person to portray Oda Nobunaga in the 71st Nagoya Festival Three Heroes Parade (三英傑行列).

== Personal life ==
Glenn has visited more than 600 Japanese castles, including Nagoya Castle more than 900 times.

== Publications ==
- Sekigahara (Booklocker, 2014) – author
- 豪州人歴史愛好家, 名城を行く (Takarajimasha, 2015) – author
- Must See! Sekigahara (Gifu Prefecture, 2018) – co-author
- Samurai Castles (Shogakukan, 2019) – co-author with Masayuki Miura
- Ninja Bilingual Guide (Shogakukan, 2019) – translator
- Naganuma Ryū Troop Movement Training Manual (Kindle, 2020) – translator
- The Battle of Sekigahara (Frontline Books, 2021) – author
- The Samurai Castle Master: Warlord Tōdō Takatora (Pen & Sword, 2023) – author

== Columns ==
- Dōmo Dōmo Dōmo – Yomiuri Shimbun Chubu edition (since 2006)
- Chris Glenn’s Meijō Let’s Go! – Chūnichi Shimbun (since 2015)
- Other local newspaper and magazine contributions on castles, tourism, and cultural history
